A.C. Marinhense is a football team in the Campeonato de Portugal based in Marinha Grande. In 2011–12, it finished 6th in promotion playoff, failing promotion to Portuguese Second Division.

Appearances

Tier 2/Liga de Honra: 29
Terceira Divisão: 25
Portuguese Cup: 56

League and cup history

Honours

AF Leiria – First Division: (5)
 1929–30, 1934–35, 1936–37, 1937–38, 1942–43

Squads
As of the 2011–12 season

Managers

 José Pestana

References

External links
Official website
Supporters website
Zerozero

Football clubs in Portugal
Association football clubs established in 1923
Sport in Leiria
1923 establishments in Portugal